Alis Vidūnas (November 8, 1934 in the village of Reketija, Kalvarija Municipality – February 19, 2009 in Vilnius) was a Lithuanian politician. 1952–1958 he studied at Kaunas Politechnical Institute, Faculty of Hydrotechnology and received profession of an engineer. April 10, 1995 – January 21, 1997, he was mayor of Vilnius,  January 15, 1997 – November 15, 2000, head of Vilnius region. Since 2001 he was marketing director in Greitkelis Ltd.

His wife, Gražina Vidūnienė, is an economist. His son is Vytis Vidūnas is a Sanskrit professor and the former head of the Centre of Oriental Studies at Vilnius University.

References

  Alis VIDŪNAS. Government of the Republic of Lithuania.

1934 births
2009 deaths
People from Kalvarija Municipality
Mayors of Vilnius